July 7 International Airport ( – Ferūdgāh bīn Almalī Haft va Tīr) is a village in Hasanabad Rural District, Fashapuyeh District, Ray County, Tehran Province, Iran. At the 2006 census, its population was 178, in 51 families.  The village is adjacent to Imam Khomeini International Airport.

References 

Populated places in Ray County, Iran